Philip Cushion (born 15 June 1978), also known by the nickname of "Cush", is an English-born former professional rugby league footballer who played in the 2000s.

2nd place Welsh Indoor Rowing Championship 2019 2km hwt 40+  time 6.24. 5

Background
Phil Cushion was born in Wigan, Greater Manchester, England.

International honours
Phil Cushion won caps for Wales while at Celtic Crusaders 2007(…present?) 1-caps + 1-cap (interchange/substitute).

References

External links
Cougars 30-30 Crusaders
Leigh 22-26 Celtic Crusaders
Swinton 32-10 Featherstone
Crusaders recruit youthful trio
Crusaders 44-28 London Skolars

1978 births
Living people
Crusaders Rugby League players
English rugby league players
Place of birth missing (living people)
Rugby league players from Wigan
Rugby league props
South Wales Scorpions players
Swinton Lions players
Wales national rugby league team players